Jury duty or jury service is service as a juror in a legal proceeding.

Juror selection process

The prosecutor and defense can dismiss potential jurors for various reasons, which can vary from one state to another, and they can have a specific number of arbitrary dismissals, or unconditional peremptory challenge, which does not require specific reasons. The judge can also dismiss potential jurors.

Some courts had been sympathetic to jurors' privacy concerns and refer to jurors by number, and conduct voir dire in camera (i.e., in private). In the United States, there have also been Fifth Amendment challenges and medical privacy (e.g., HIPAA) objections to this.

Australia
Australia uses an adversarial system, and potential jurors are randomly selected from an electoral roll.

Jurors receive a small payment for each day of attendance. Employers are also required to pay their employees "make-up pay", that is, the usual pay the employee would have earned from working, less the jury duty payment received from the state. Under the National Employment Standards, make-up pay is required only for the first ten days of jury service; however, the laws of Victoria, Queensland and Western Australia extend the make-up pay requirement for the entire duration of the jury service.

New South Wales
The jury system in New South Wales is administered by the Jury Services Branch of the Office of the Sheriff of New South Wales, an office in the New South Wales Department of Attorney General and Justice, and operates in accordance with the Jury Act 1977 and Jury Amendment Act 2010. These laws detail persons who are disqualified, ineligible, or may be excused from jury service. In addition, the Jury Exemption Act 1965 and section 7, "Excuse for cause", of LRC Report 117 (2007) details other persons who can or may not serve as jurors or otherwise claim exemption.

Individuals who are blind and/or deaf may be excluded from jury service.

During the juror selection process, both parties can object to up to three potential jurors without providing reasons.

The Office of the Sheriff of NSW disseminates resources for jurors. Jurors may be compensated for their service.

United Kingdom

According to 2016 figures from the Ministry of Justice, there is about a 35% chance of people in England and Wales being summoned for jury service over the course of their lifetime. In Scotland, the percentage is much higher due to having a lower population as well having juries made up of 15 people (as opposed to 12 people in England and Wales).

United States

When a person is called for jury duty in the United States, that service is mandatory, and the person summoned for jury duty must attend. Failing to report for jury duty is illegal and results in a wide range of penalties, from simply being placed back into the selection pool to immediate criminal prosecution and having a bench warrant issued for contempt of court. Employers are not allowed to fire an employee for being called to jury duty, but they are typically not required to pay salaries during this time. Jury duty reimbursement is as little as $5 per day, although a juror can plead to be excused for financial hardship. A citizen who reports to jury duty may be asked to serve as a juror in a trial or as an alternate juror, or they may be dismissed.

In the United States, government employees are in a paid status of leave (in accordance with ) for the duration spent serving as a juror (also known as court duty or court leave by some organizations). Many quasi-governmental organizations have adopted this provision into their contract manuals. Accordingly, government employees are in a paid status as long as they have received a summons in connection with a judicial proceeding, by a court or authority responsible for the conduct of that proceeding to serve as a juror (or witness) in the District of Columbia or a state, territory, or possession of the United States, Puerto Rico, or the Trust Territory of the Pacific Islands.

The Supreme Court of the United States has held, in Butler v. Perry, 240 U.S. 328 (1916), that the Thirteenth Amendment, which prohibits "slavery [and] involuntary servitude, except as a punishment for crime," does not prohibit "enforcement of those duties which individuals owe to the state, such as services in the army, militia, on the jury, etc."

In both the United States and Canada, jurors having conscientious objection to service are generally excused from service. This chiefly includes religious groups such as the Amish, Conservative Mennonites, and Old Order Mennonites.

in the United States
Since 2012, some US citizens have been targets of a "jury scam", wherein they are called by persons posing as officers from a court, claiming that the person did not show up for jury duty and that charges will be pressed. Potential victims of identity theft or fraud, these targets are then told that the matter can be resolved if personal information is given. The Department of Justice recommends that recipients of these calls contact the court directly to avoid falling victim to this scam.

Federal courts mostly use the United States Postal Service (USPS) in their communications with prospective jurors, and any calls that are made will never ask for personal information.

References

External links
 

Judiciaries
Criminal procedure
Juries
Local government